See also Morihei Magatani (assistant director).

 (born 23 May 1923) was a Japanese film director.

Filmography 
Magatani directed 28 films:
 (Yojaso no maō) (1957)
 (ソ連脱出　女軍医と偽狂人 Soren dasshutsu: Joguni to nisekyōjin) lit. Escape from the Soviet Union: Female Army Doctor and the Fake Lunatic (1958)
 Girl Diver of Spook Mansion (Ama no bakemono yashiki) (1959)
 Blood Sword of the 99th Virgin (Kyuju-kyuhonme no kimusume) (1959)
 Fūryū Kokkei-tan: Sennin Buraku (1961) - animated film

References

External links 
 https://www.imdb.com/name/nm0535744/

1923 births
Possibly living people
Japanese film directors